River Street Historic District can be one of three listed on the U.S. National Register of Historic Places

River Street Historic District (New Haven, Connecticut), part of the Fair Haven section of that city
River Street Historic District (Troy, New York), now part of the Central Troy Historic District
Northern River Street Historic District, another Troy neighborhood
River Street Historic District (Wilkes-Barre, Pennsylvania).